Elias Solomon (2 September 1839 – 23 May 1909) was an Australian politician based in Fremantle. He was Mayor of Fremantle, MLA for South Fremantle, and the first Member for Fremantle in the Australian House of Representatives.

Early life 
Solomon was born in London, England to Leah and Moss Solomon and migrated to Australia as a child, living at first in Sydney and then Adelaide. His uncle Emanuel Solomon owned the Queen's Theatre in Adelaide, and Solomon's father Moss was for a short while made manager. The family returned to Sydney until Moss' death in 1849 when Leah again moved to Adelaide and Solomon was educated at Adelaide Educational Institution.

Career 

After finishing school, Solomon joined another of his uncle's business concerns and in 1857 was sent to Mauritius to purchase goods. On his return, he worked for the firm of Solomon and Salom in Adelaide, and also Falk and Co. of Melbourne.

At the age of 29 Solomon headed west to Fremantle in Western Australia, arriving on 20 January 1868 aboard Eliza Blanche and initially living in Henry Street. Soon the same year he was joined by two of his nephews and together then formed Solomon & Nephews, Auctioneers and Agents of which Solomon was clerk and auctioneer. This venture was part-financed by his half-brother Judah Moss Solomon (of Melbourne) and brother-in-law Isaac Solomon (of Adelaide).

The weight of conducting business in a depressed economic environment bore on Solomon, and this was not helped by his nephews being active members of Fremantle's Amateur Dramatics Company, performing at the Oddfellows in William Street. He wrote to them in July 1869: "…that you may not be under any misunderstanding with regard to my present dissatisfaction, I will be more explicit. You have taken up time belonging to the firm in Amateur Theatrical matters which, I believe, is acting prejudiciously to the business…"

In 1881 he was elected to the Fremantle City Council. In 1892, he was elected to the Western Australian Legislative Assembly as the member for South Fremantle, where he remained until 1901. In that year, he transferred to federal politics, winning the Australian House of Representatives seat of Fremantle for the Free Trade Party. He was defeated by Labor's William Carpenter in 1903. Solomon died in 1909. Solomon was at one time head of the Fremantle Cemetery board, which is where he is buried.

Ocean View residence
Solomon's residence, Ocean View at 134 Solomon Street, Beaconsfield, was completed in 1887 in the Victorian Regency style. After his death it served as military hospital during World War One, until 1917, and as a maternity hospital during in the years between the wars. It now has reverted to a private residence again and is heritage listed .

Family 

Solomon was married twice, firstly to Agnes Elizabeth Bickley ( – 22 April 1886) and after her death, to Elizabeth Stokes (16 September 1868 – 3 December 1898) on 1 May 1887. They had five children.

 

 Wallace Elias Bickley Solomon (1878–1950) was the first secretary, and honorary solicitor, of the Royal Western Australian Historical Society in 1926.
 Maurice Elias Solomon (1888–1977), lawyer and councillor of the City of Fremantle.

References

External links 
Prominent Australian Jews

English Jews
English emigrants to Australia
People educated at Adelaide Educational Institution
Free Trade Party members of the Parliament of Australia
Jewish Australian politicians
Members of the Australian House of Representatives for Fremantle
Members of the Australian House of Representatives
Members of the Western Australian Legislative Assembly
Australian auctioneers
1839 births
1909 deaths
Burials at Fremantle Cemetery
19th-century Australian politicians
20th-century Australian politicians
19th-century Australian businesspeople
Mayors of Fremantle